Maxillaria virguncula is a species of orchid endemic to the Venezuelan Antilles and northern Venezuela.

References

External links 

virguncula
Endemic orchids of Venezuela